Vinod Kumar Sonkar is an Indian politician, a member of the Bharatiya Janata Party. Since 2014, he is the Member of parliament from Kaushambi. He is also the National Secretary of BJP and the current chairperson of parliamentary committee on Ethics.

Early life and education

Vinod Kumar Sonkar was born on 18 February 1970 to Shri Amar Nath Sonkar and Smt. Champa Devi. He was born in Sadiyapur, located in Allahabad district in Uttar Pradesh. Sonkar completed his graduation from Allahabad University. He married Sangeeta Sonkar on 22 May 2002.

Political career

May, 2014: Elected to 16th Lok Sabha
1 Sep. 2014 onwards: Member, Standing Committee on Commerce; Member, Consultative Committee, Ministry of Petroleum and Natural Gas
30 July. 2017 Vice president BJP Uttar Pradesh unit (till July 2019) 
10 Oct. 2017 onwards: National president, BJP (S.C. morcha) (till Oct. 2020)
May 2019: Elected again to the 17th Lok Sabha
09 Oct. 2019 onwards: Chairman of Ethics committee
Oct. 2020: National Secretary BJP
Nov. 2020: Incharge Tripura BJP

References

Living people
India MPs 2014–2019
Lok Sabha members from Uttar Pradesh
People from Kaushambi district
Bharatiya Janata Party politicians from Uttar Pradesh
1970 births
People from Allahabad district
India MPs 2019–present